The Kinzers Formation is a geologic formation in Pennsylvania. It preserves fossils dating back to the Cambrian Period.

The base of the Kinzers Formation is primarily a dark-brown shale. The middle is a gray and white spotted limestone and, locally, marble having irregular partings. The top is a sandy limestone which weathers to a fine-grained, friable, porous, sandy mass.

Type section 
Named from exposures at a railroad cut at Kinzers, Lancaster County, Pennsylvania.

Other outcrops 
The Kinzers overlies the Vintage Dolomite at the type section of the Vintage at a railroad cut at Vintage, Pennsylvania.

High quality fossil specimens (Lagerstätte) were obtained from the Noah Getz Quarry, one mile north of Rohrerstown, Pennsylvania, but the quarry location is overgrown and disturbed by development.  The fossils are from the Emigsville Member, and include the trilobite Olenellus thompsoni, the radiodont Lenisicaris pennsylvanica, the bivalve Tuzoia getzi, and the green algae Margaretia dorus.

See also 

 List of fossiliferous stratigraphic units in Pennsylvania
 Paleontology in Pennsylvania

References

External links 
 

Geologic formations of Maryland
Paleontology in Maryland
Geologic formations of Pennsylvania
Paleontology in Pennsylvania
Cambrian geology of Pennsylvania
Geologic formations of Virginia
Paleontology in Virginia
Cambrian south paleopolar deposits
Cambrian southern paleotemperate deposits